Marentino is a comune (municipality) in the Metropolitan City of Turin in the Italian region Piedmont, located about  east of Turin.

Marentino borders the following municipalities: Sciolze, Moncucco Torinese, Montaldo Torinese, Arignano, and Andezeno.

References

Cities and towns in Piedmont